"Country Grammar (Hot Shit)" (also known as "Country Grammar (Hot...)") is the debut single of American rapper Nelly. The song was written by Nelly and Jason "Jay E" Epperson, who also produced the track. Released on February 29, 2000, as the lead single from Nelly's 2000 debut album, Country Grammar, the single peaked at number seven in both the United States and the United Kingdom and reached the top 20 in Australia, Canada, Germany, and the Netherlands.

Composition

The song's melody and chorus were taken from a song popularly sung by children with clapping games called "Down Down Baby". On the clean version, the word "shit" is backmasked, and most of the explicit words are replaced by radio-friendly words and bleep-related sound effects. For instance, the lyrics "street sweeper baby cocked" in the chorus are replaced with "boom boom baby" due to its reference to a shotgun.

"Country Grammar" references Beenie Man's 1998 dancehall single "Who Am I (Sim Simma)" with the line, "Keys to my beemer, man, holla at Beenie Man".

Track listings

Charts

Weekly charts

Year-end charts

Certifications

Release history

References

External links
 "Country Grammar (Hot Shit)" at Discogs (list of releases)
 

2000 debut singles
2000 songs
Songs about St. Louis
Music videos directed by Marc Klasfeld
Nelly songs
Songs based on children's songs
Songs written by Jay E
Songs written by Nelly
Universal Records singles